Amos Emanuel Fowler (born February 11, 1956) is a former American football center who played seven seasons for the Detroit Lions in the National Football League (NFL).

References

1956 births
Living people
Players of American football from Pensacola, Florida
American football centers
Southern Miss Golden Eagles football players
Detroit Lions players